Jim G. Shaffer (born 1944) is an American archaeologist and professor of anthropology at Case Western Reserve University.

Academic career
Shaffer holds a B.A. (1965) and M.A. (1967) in Anthropology from Arizona State University. He also has a Ph.D. (1972) in Anthropology from  University of Wisconsin–Madison.

Rejection of "Aryan invasion"
Shaffer is known for his studies on the Indus Valley civilization. According to him, there is no archaeological indication of an Aryan migration into northwestern India during or after the decline of the Harappan city culture. Instead, Shaffer has argued for "a series of cultural changes reflecting indigenous cultural developments." According to Shaffer, linguistic change has mistakenly been attributed to migrations of people. Shaffer gives two possible alternative explanations for the similarities between Sanskrit and western languages. The first is a linguistic relationship with a "Zagrosian family of language linking Elamite and Dravidian on the Iranian Plateau," as proposed by McAlpin; according to Shaffer "linguistic similarities may have diffused west from the plateau as a result of the extensive trading networks linking cultures in the plateau with those in Mesopotamia and beyond," while also linking with the Kelteminar culture in Central Asia. Yet, Shaffer also notes that the Harappan culture was not extensively tied to this network in the third century BCE, leaving the possibility that "membership in a basic linguistic family - Zagrosian - may account for some of the linguistic similarities of later periods." The second possibility is that "such linguistic similarities are a result of post-second millennium B.C. contacts with the west." According to Shaffer, "[o]nce codified, it was advantageous for the emerging hereditary social elites to stabilize such linguistic traits with the validity of the explanations offered in the literature enhancing their social position."

Publications

Prehistoric Baluchistan: With Excavation Report on Said Qala Tepe.
A Honaki Phase Site on the Lower Verde River, Arizona.

Notes

References

Sources

External links

 Curriculum vitae
 Faculty webpage

1944 births
Living people
University of Wisconsin–Madison College of Letters and Science alumni
American anthropologists
American archaeologists
Arizona State University alumni
People associated with the Indus Valley civilisation
Indigenous Aryanism